The 2019 Australian motorcycle Grand Prix was the seventeenth round of the 2019 MotoGP season. It was held at the Phillip Island Grand Prix Circuit in Phillip Island on 27 October 2019.

Lorenzo Dalla Porta clinched the title in the Moto3 category after securing his third win of the season. The 22-year old Italian also took advantage of an early crash of his main rival Arón Canet on lap 3 to eliminate any remaining hopes of the Spaniard winning the championship. With two races remaining, Dalla Porta headed to the penultimate round in Sepang with a comfortable lead in the standings by a further 72 points ahead of Canet in 2nd place. 

As of 2021, Dalla Porta is the first and only Italian rider to win the lightweight class title since its introduction in 2012.

Classification

MotoGP

 Miguel Oliveira crashed in FP4 and was declared unfit to compete.

Moto2

Moto3

 Niccolò Antonelli withdrew from the event due to shoulder pain from a crash in qualifying.

Championship standings after the race

MotoGP

Moto2

Moto3

Notes

References

Australia
Motorcycle Grand Prix
Australian motorcycle Grand Prix
Australian motorcycle Grand Prix
Motorsport at Phillip Island